Antonella Ponziani (born 29 February 1964) is an Italian actress.

Born in Rome, she attended the academy Mimo Teatro Movimento, under the guidance of Lidia Biondi.  She debuted in 1986, in Salvatore Samperi's La Bonne, and appeared in Federico Fellini's Intervista (1987) and as Donald Pleasence's daughter in Ruggero Deodato's 1988 giallo film Phantom of Death.

In 1992 Antonella Ponziani won a Silver Ribbon for Best Actress and a David di Donatello in the same category for the film Verso Sud. She appeared in the 1994 comedy Dear Goddamned Friends, and won a Ciak d'oro for Best Supporting Actress in 1996 for her performance in Ferie d'Agosto by Paolo Virzì.

In 1999 she debuted as director and screenwriter with the comedy film L'ultimo Mundial, in which she also appeared as an actress.

References

External links 
 

Italian film actresses
1964 births
Actresses from Rome
Italian television actresses
Living people
David di Donatello winners
Nastro d'Argento winners
Ciak d'oro winners
20th-century Italian actresses
21st-century Italian actresses